SumOfUs is a global non-profit advocacy organization and online community that campaigns to hold corporations accountable on issues such as climate change, workers' rights, discrimination, human rights, animal rights, corruption, and corporate power grab.

Founding 
Australian-American activist Taren Stinebrickner-Kauffman is the founder of SumOfUs and was its executive director from 2011 to 2016. In November 2016, Hannah Lownsbrough became the new executive director of SumOfUs.

History 
SumOfUs was launched in 2011 with campaigns targeting Google's links to the US Chamber of Commerce, a campaign to thank Starbucks for supporting same-sex marriage in the United States, and calling on Apple to force its suppliers to treat their workers more ethically.

The organization says that since its launch, it has expanded to have five million members.

SumOfUs has staff in the United Kingdom, Canada, Germany, France, Lithuania, Colombia and the Netherlands.

Notable campaigns 
In December 2013, after a week of pressure from SumOfUs members, Zara and major UK retailers Topshop and Asos committed to stop selling Angora from rabbits that were plucked live for their fur.

In February 2014, SumOfUs demanded in a petition that "the cereal maker [Kellogg's] get tough with Wilmar or end its supply and distribution joint venture with the company". Kellogg's subsequently committed  to buy only sustainably sourced palm oil.

In 2015, SumOfUs helped to push airline companies such as Delta to stop shipping hunting trophies, lobbied Canadian officials to charge Nestle responsible water rates for drawing water from public lands, and helped get Standard Chartered Bank to cancel its financing of Adani's giant Australian coal mine.

Methodology 
SumOfUs uses digital technology to organize and communicate globally, connecting consumers, workers and investors from around the world.

One of SumOfUs' primary functions is to amplify other corporate accountability organizations' campaigns by launching rapid-response campaigns.

The online campaigning NGO operates using lean start-up methodology, by adapting the "minimum viable product" model to the online campaigning field. SumOfUs mirrors corporations' global perspective and power base – and transcends national boundaries to take advantage of transnational companies' vulnerabilities.

Financial contributors 
SumOfUs is a registered 501(c)(4) social welfare nonprofit. Around 85% of SumOfUs funds come from small donations from its members. SumOfUs publishes the source of revenues every year on its web site. According to the Form 990 SumOfUs filed for 2016, $631,515 was contributed by a single anonymous person. According to the Form 990 SumOfUs filed for 2015, $595,000 was contributed by two anonymous donors.

See also 
 Internet activism

References 

Consumer rights activists
Internet-based activism
Internet properties established in 2011
Anti-corporate activism